Swedish Agency for Support to Faith Communities (Swedish: Myndigheten för stöd till trossamfund) is an agency that provides state aid to religious communities in Sweden.

In 2011 the Reinfeldt Cabinet via the Minister for Public Administration, Stefan Attefall, announced that the state aid to was to increase from 50 million SEK to 60 million, in particular directed towards Islam and the orthodox church. In 2011, 22 faith communities qualified for state aid.

Some of the state aid was directed towards Jewish congregations to enable them to commission security installations to thwart antisemitic attacks. In 2015 this state aid was widened to include all faith communities, provided they qualified for state aid.

Leadership 
 Åke Göransson, director (2017)

References

External links
 Swedish Agency for Support to Faith Communities official webpage

Government agencies of Sweden